Avellaneda Department may refer to:

Avellaneda Department, Río Negro
Avellaneda Department, Santiago del Estero

See also
Avellaneda (disambiguation)

Department name disambiguation pages